Stenella canavaliae or Stenella canavaliae-roseae, formerly known as Cercospora canavaliae is a species of anamorphic fungi. It causes the brown leaf mould of Canavalia species.

Description
Belonging to the Stenella genus, this species is a Cercospora-like fungus with a superficial secondary mycelium, solitary conidiophores, conidiogenous cells with thickened and darkened conidiogenous loci and catenate or single conidia with dark, slightly thickened hila.

Distribution
It is found in tropical Asia, Africa and America, on C. Ensiformis and C. Rosea, and in South America on C. Plagiosperma.

See also
Stenella africana
Stenella constricta
Stenella uniformis
Stenella vermiculata
Stenella capparidicola
Stenella gynoxidicola

References

Further reading

External links

canavaliae
Fungi described in 1971